The Discovery of Heaven is a 1992 novel by Dutch writer Harry Mulisch. It is considered Mulisch's masterpiece and was voted best book in the Dutch language in a 2007 poll among the readers of NRC Handelsblad.

A 2001 film adaptation by director Jeroen Krabbé features Stephen Fry and Flora Montgomery in the leading roles.

Plot summary
An angel-like being is ordered to return to Heaven the stone tablets containing the Ten Commandments. The divine being, however, cannot himself travel to Earth, and on several occasions in the book resorts to influencing events. He affects the personal lives of three people (two men and one woman) in order that a child will be conceived. This child would then have an innate desire to seek out and return the Tablets.

The book consists of four parts (dubbed "The Beginning of the Beginning", "The End of the Beginning", "The Beginning of the End", and "The End of the End"). In between these four parts, the angel-like being discusses "The Plan" with his superior, who is supposedly an archangel.

The Beginning of the Beginning
The book begins with the angel reporting to his superior that 'the job is done', and beginning to recount the events. He explains that after seventy years' work and planning, he has created a messenger to return the Tablets, and how, in order for the messenger to be conceived, he first needed to allow the birth of the messenger's parents. He then explains how the First and Second World War were instrumental in this. The messenger's father, Max Delius, was born of a Jewish mother and a German officer in 1933. The messenger's mother, Ada Brons, is born in 1946 to Dutch parents, who also meet in WWII. A third man, Onno Quist, is born into a renowned Conservative political family, also in the year 1933.

The angel arranges for the men, Onno and Max, to meet in 1967. Onno has just left a family gathering and is in need of a ride to Amsterdam. By apparent chance to the characters, but clearly a deus ex machina-effect to the reader, Max is the one to give him a ride. They become friends: Onno and Max's personalities are highly complementary. Onno is an introverted, rather arrogant and highly intelligent linguistic genius who, despite his gift for languages, studied law. While Onno is trying to 'find God' in the Diskos of Phaistos, Max is trying to 'discover Heaven' through astronomy. A more extroverted, erotomanious astronomer, Max is haunted by his rather dark family history: Max's mother, a Jewish woman, was purportedly murdered in Auschwitz, on instigation of his father, an Austrian officer in the Wehrmacht. After the war his father was imprisoned and later executed by the firing squad. Max was consequently raised by foster parents.

Onno and Max's friendship reaches a high in the many vibrant conversations they have in Leiden and Amsterdam, in experiencing the revolution of the sixties. Their conversations are filled with great wit and intellect and range over many facets of life: science, history, politics, but especially religion and philosophy. Their friendship, however, absorbs them so much that it forces a break between Onno and his girlfriend, Helga.

During a walk in Leiden they come across a small bookshop. Here Max meets Ada, the daughter of the owner and a gifted cellist. The two become three. Ada and Max fall in love. This is rather new for both of them: Ada, who is only twenty, loses her virginity to Max, who has never had a lasting relationship with a woman. One day, Max unwittingly causes Ada to break up with him by leaving abruptly during sex, telling Ada to just make herself come (Maak jezelf maar klaar. in Dutch).  Max is also haunted by his family history. Moved by Roma music, who too suffered from the Shoah, he goes to Auschwitz, Poland, to seek his parents' history. Ada and Onno, left alone by the sudden departure of Max, fall in love.

When Max returns he sees his best friend with his former girlfriend, but he accepts this change. Onno, meanwhile, has become deputy mayor for the Labour party in Amsterdam and begins his political career. Although nearly everything has changed, their friendship still seems very strong.

The three of them then go to Cuba, (where Castro has recently gained power and is fashionable in the leftist elite), and Ada is asked to play the cello. In Cuba, Max and Onno are mistaken for the Dutch delegation to a revolutionary conference, which they attend more as a joke than anything else. On their last day on the island, Onno is seduced by a Cuban woman. At the beach, Max is unable to suppress his libido and makes love to Ada in the Cuban sea. Directly after this event, Onno and Ada meet each other in their hotel room, and sleep with each other.

The End of the Beginning
Back in the Netherlands, Ada finds out she is pregnant. The child was conceived in Cuba. She tells this to Onno, who then proposes to marry her, assuming the child is his. Max realizes the child is equally likely to be his and decides to leave Ada and Onno, filled with feelings of guilt. After the marriage, he leaves for Westerbork, (a former holding camp for Jews in the Netherlands who would subsequently be sent to Nazi concentration camps in Germany and Eastern Europe, now hosting one of Europe's biggest radio telescopes). 
Onno and Ada still visit Max. On one of their visits to Westerbork, Ada receives a phone call from a Leiden hospital: her father has had a heart attack. The three of them drive back to Leiden and are caught in bad weather. Their car crashes. Max and Onno escape without a scratch. Ada, however, is badly hurt and falls into a coma, but the child she is carrying has survived. Max is sent to Leiden to inform Ada's mother, Mrs. (Sophie) Brons, about the events. He arrives in Leiden in the middle of the night. Mr Brons has died and Ada is in coma. Mrs. Brons convinces Max that he must stay the night. Max and Mrs. Brons sleep together.

Max begins to visit Mrs. Brons frequently. During the day the two maintain a formal relationship and are secretly lovers at night. Ada and Onno's child still survives and needs a home. Onno cannot take care of the child alone, and he also has a bright political future.  Max suggests to Mrs. Brons that she move to Westerbork. Together they can raise Ada's child in Westerbork and continue their affair.

The Beginning of the End
The child is born through Caesarean section. The child has bright blue eyes and does not cry once, not even during labor. Onno calls the child Quinten. Max and Mrs. Brons move to an apartment near Westerbork in a former castle, now inhabited by artists and eccentrics. Quinten grows up to be an introverted, peaceful child as intelligent as his father. (The reader has the knowledge that Max is the father.) He is obsessed by architecture, ancient keys and obelisks. Onno, who is absorbed by his political career, only infrequently visits his son.

As Quinten grows up he is haunted by dreams of a strange, otherworldly place that has no outside but only an inside. This inside is filled with strange bridges, cranes and architecture. This fuels his interest in architecture and causes him to obsessively make drawings of this place. He also takes care of an old cemetery lot in the garden of the castle, where a racing horse is buried. He seems a rather strange child.

Meanwhile, Onno's political career is destroyed, when his visit to revolutionary Cuba is made public. His position within the Labour Party is unretainable and he is not promoted to minister of Defense. That same day, his new girlfriend (Helga again) is killed. With very little left to live for, Onno decides to disappear.

Max, meanwhile, has returned to his old tricks. He leaves Mrs. Brons for another woman but still lives with her and Quinten. Scientifically he is on the verge of making a major astronomical discovery. When he discovers heaven (located beyond the Big Bang in negative space), he is killed by a freak meteoroid, sent from heaven by Angel. (In the movie, Gabriel sends the meteor, even after Angel complains and explains that they still need Max.)

The End of the End
When Quinten is 16, he decides to look for his father. Except for his mother and grandmother he has very little that binds him to Westerbork. He goes to Italy. He visits Venice and Florence but through meetings with strange people, he is forced to flee both cities. He eventually arrives in Rome. In the Pantheon, he is approached by a strange man with a long beard and a raven on his shoulder. He realizes that it is his father. Onno has fled to Rome and has filled his life with his original quest to decipher the Diskos of Phaistos.

Onno takes Quinten on a tour through Rome. Although they haven't seen each other in years, their relationship is close. Onno recognizes a lot of his friend, Max, in Quinten. When they visit the Lateran (one of Rome's holiest sights), Quinten is convinced that he remembers the place from his dreams and that the stone tablets are stored there. He becomes obsessed with the place and with the role of the stone tablets in Christianity and Judaism.
After weeks of study, Quinten convinces his father to steal the stone tablet. One night they stay for too long in the Lateran and are locked in. With Quinten's study of ancient architecture and locksmithing and Onno's encyclopedic knowledge, they open the chapel of the Lateran and in a safe they find two stone tablets, grey slabs. Later they learn that the slabs are made of a bright blue gem.
They take the first flight from Rome to Tel Aviv, Israel. Onno and Quinten stay in Jerusalem and visit the city's sights, including the Dome of the Rock, where the stone tablets were stored for ages when the Jews inhabited the city, before the Romans sacked the temple.

After meeting an elderly woman who speaks Dutch, with very blue eyes and numbers tattooed on her arm, Onno realizes that she might be Max's mother and Quinten's grandmother. He goes to tell Quinten but cannot find him. In a state of distress, he calls Mrs. Brons. He learns that Ada has died; Mrs. Brons, a former nurse, has performed euthanasia. While speaking with her on the phone, Onno suffers a stroke.

Quinten has gone into a hallucinative state. In a sort of dream world, filled with references to Jewish mysticism, he returns to the Dome of the Rock with the stone tablets. He meets his father's raven and the race horse, whose burial place he kept. In the Dome of the Rock he ascends to heaven with the tablets.

Back in heaven, the Angel is commended for his deeds by the Archangel. The Angel, however, feels remorse for breaking the link between heaven and earth. But the situation is no longer in his control.

Reception

In a review of the German translation, Der Spiegel called The Discovery of Heaven a masterpiece that successfully captured the plight of the post-War generation in Europe, that "drags along its parents' crimes suffering for life". In the Netherlands, the novel's publication led critics to compare Mulisch with Thomas Mann and Robert Musil; a review in Trouw called it the work of a virtuoso, "amusing, yet also touching and exciting".

A 1997 New York Times review was less favorable, praising the book for its "novelistic bravura", but criticizing the "labyrinthine middle section" that "slows it nearly to a halt".

Adaptation
In 2001 the book was made into a movie of the same name by Jeroen Krabbé. Mulisch allowed his novel be adapted for film on condition that the English comedian Stephen Fry play Onno Quist. Krabbé did not follow the book closely and removed some of the longer pieces, especially the friendship between Max and Onno and the youth of Quinten. He changed some events for dramatic reasons.

See also

References

External links
The Discovery of Heaven A collection of book reviews at The Complete Review
 
 

1992 novels
Novels about friendship
Dutch-language novels
20th-century Dutch novels
Dutch novels adapted into films
Novels by Harry Mulisch
Novels set in the Netherlands
De Bezige Bij books

fr:La Découverte du ciel